Neotullbergia is a genus of arthropods belonging to the family Tullbergiidae.

The species of this genus are found in Europe.

Species:
 Neotullbergia ramicuspis (Gisin, 1953) 
 Neotullbergia staudacheri (Kos, 1940) 
 Neotullbergia tricuspis (Borner, 1903)

References

Collembola
Springtail genera